Gorytina is a subtribe of sand wasps in the family Crabronidae. There are at least 20 genera and 370 described species in Gorytina.

Genera
These 26 genera belong to the subtribe Gorytina:

 Afrogorytes Menke, 1967 i c g
 Allogorytes R. Bohart, 2000 i c g
 Arigorytes Rohwer, 1912 i c g
 Aroliagorytes R. Bohart, 2000 i c g
 Austrogorytes R. Bohart, 1967 i c g
 Eogorytes R. Bohart, 1976 i c g
 Epigorytes R. Bohart, 2000 i c g
 Gorytes Latreille, 1805 i c g b
 Hapalomellinus Ashmead, 1899 i c g
 Harpactostigma Ashmead, 1899 i c g
 Harpactus Shuckard, 1837 i c g b
 Hoplisoides Gribodo, 1884 i c g b
 Lestiphorus Lepeletier, 1832 i c g b
 Leurogorytes R. Bohart, 2000 i c g
 Liogorytes R. Bohart, 1967 i c g
 Megistommum W. Schulz, 1906 i c g
 Oryttus Spinola, 1836 i c g
 Psammaecius Lepeletier, 1832 i c g
 Psammaletes Pate, 1936 i c g b
 Sagenista R. Bohart, 1967 i c g
 Saygorytes Nemkov, 2007 i c g b
 Stenogorytes Schrottky, 1911 i c g
 Stethogorytes R. Bohart, 2000 i c g
 Tretogorytes R. Bohart, 2000 i c g
 Trichogorytes Rohwer, 1912 i c g
 Xerogorytes R. Bohart, 1976 i c g

Data sources: i = ITIS, c = Catalogue of Life, g = GBIF, b = Bugguide.net

References

Further reading

External links

 

Crabronidae